Charles Ayume is a Ugandan medical doctor and politician. He is a member of the Ugandan Parliament representing Koboko Municipality on the ticket of National Resistance Movement (NRM).

Personal life 
His father, Francis Ayume was a lawyer, politician and a member of Ugandan Parliament who occupied Koboko Municiaplity seat and was the speaker from 1998 to 2001 during the sixth parliament which was in session from 1996 to 2001. He served as Attorney General until his death in an auto crash in 2004. Charles studied medicine and qualified to practice in 2004, same year his father died.

Political career 
Ayume ran in the NRM primary election against the incumbent MP and the State Minister of Finance Evelyn Anite, a strong supporter of President Yoweri Museveni. During the campaign for the primary election, Ayume's supporters and the police clashed after the police attempted to stop Ayume's campaign rally in an enforcement of COVID-19 guidelines. His supporters accused the police of bias in favour of his opponent Anite who held campaign rally the previous day without disruption and went on to deface Anite's campaign posters.  Ayume won the party's nomination with 8089 defeating Anite who polled 7321 to run in the general election. He won the general election and was sworn in on 17 May 2021, one month after the day his father, who had previously occupied the seat, died 17 years earlier on 17 April 2004.

References 

Ugandan politicians
National Resistance Movement politicians
People from Koboko District
Living people

Year of birth missing (living people)